The 1939 Carnegie Tech Tartans football team represented the Carnegie Institute of Technology—now known as Carnegie Mellon University—as an independent during the 1939 college football season. Led by Bill Kern in his third and final season as head coach, the Tartans compiled a record of 3–5. Carnegie Tech played home games at Pitt Stadium in Pittsburgh.

Schedule

References

Carnegie Tech
Carnegie Mellon Tartans football seasons
Carnegie Tech Tartans football